USS Petaluma may refer to:

USS Petaluma (AOG-69), was a gasoline tanker launched in 1945, renamed Transpet and eventually acquired by British-American Oil
, was a gasoline tanker launched in 1945 as MT Racoon Bend

United States Navy ship names